Sédiogo is a sub-prefecture in northern Ivory Coast. It is in Sinématiali Department, Poro Region, Savanes District. The seat of the sub-prefecture is the town of Gbalèkaha.

Sédiogo is one of the few sub-prefectures of Ivory Coast that is not named after a settlement located within the sub-prefecture.

Sédiogo was a commune until March 2012, when it became one of 1126 communes nationwide that were abolished.

In 2014, the population of the sub-prefecture of Sédiogo was 5,757.

Villages
The 28 villages of the sub-prefecture of Sédiogo and their population in 2014 are:

Notes

Sub-prefectures of Poro Region
Former communes of Ivory Coast